Years in Indonesia begins in 1945, prior to that, Years in Dutch East Indies (1600–1940) is more accurate.

16th century

17th century

18th century

19th century

20th century

21st century

See also
 Timeline of Indonesian history
 Timeline of Jakarta

 
Indonesia history-related lists
Indonesia